Mexican singer Sofía Reyes has released two studio albums, twenty-five singles (including ten as a featured artist), and five promotional singles.

Studio albums

Singles

As lead artist

As a featured artist

Promotional singles

Notes

References

Discographies of Mexican artists